Mark Nicholls may refer to:
 Mark Nicholls (footballer), English footballer
 Mark Nicholls (rugby league), Australian rugby league player
 Mark Nicholls (rugby union), New Zealand rugby union player and selector

See also
 Mark Nichols (disambiguation)